The Ozark Valley Railroad is a 27-mile shortline railroad connecting Mexico, Missouri, and Fulton, Missouri.

Connection
The Kansas City Southern Railway links to the Ozark Valley Railroad at Mexico, Missouri.

Motive Power
 EMD GP7 #1362

References

External links
 Fulton Sun, Sale of rail spur vital for development efforts, officials say

Missouri railroads
Switching and terminal railroads